Crypt Falls is a waterfall in southwestern Alberta in Waterton Lakes National Park. It is viewable from the Crypt Lake Trail via ferry service from the Waterton town-site. It drops out of Crypt Lake and feeds a smaller lake below it. The true height of the fall is unknown but it is estimated to be taller than it currently is listed as.

References

Crypt Falls, Rocky Mountain perfection! - Secret World

Waterfalls of Alberta
Waterton Lakes National Park